My Documents is the commonly recognized name of a special folder in Microsoft Windows (starting with Windows Vista, it is called Documents only, and the actual name of the folder might be different when the language of the installed copy of Windows is not English). The folder functions both as an area for the user to store their personal data and as a repository for application data, such as configuration files and saved games.

Until Windows XP, it contained other subfolders such as "My Pictures", "My Music" and "My Videos". Starting with Windows Vista, these subfolders are now located alongside "Documents" in each user account's folder.

Overview 
Microsoft first introduced the "My Documents" folder in Windows 95 OEM Service Release 2 as a standard location for storing user-created files. In this version of Windows, the folder is located under the root directory of the boot volume (i.e., if Windows is installed to drive C:, then My Documents will be located at the root of C:). A shortcut to it is displayed directly on the user's desktop.

The Windows NT family of operating systems set up the "My Documents" folder in the user's profile folder. In Windows XP and earlier, the path is \Documents and Settings\[user name]\My Documents\ (alias %USERPROFILE%\My Documents\) on boot volume. A user can later change the physical location of "My Documents". However, "My Documents" in Windows Explorer (and file dialog boxes) doesn't appear as an absolute path. In addition to translation, the display name of the folder might change depending on owner of the folder. For example, if a user who has logged on to Windows XP and later with user account A look at the personal folders of user account B via Windows Explorer, instead of "My Documents", "B's Documents" is seen. This customization is achieved using desktop.ini file.

Windows Vista made many changes to this folder. Dropping "My" in its name, it is stored in \Users\[user name]\Documents regardless of the Windows language. Windows Explorer, however, shows a different display name for it, depending on the chosen language. For instance, an English copy of Windows shows "My Documents", a French copy shows "Mes documents" and a German copy shows "Eigene Dokumente" (changed from "Eigene Dateien" in Windows XP). Additionally, "My Pictures", "My Music" and "My Videos" are no longer stored within it; they are instead stored alongside "Documents" in the user’s folder, and are now called "Pictures", "Music" and "Videos".

Use by applications 
In addition to storing the personal files of the user, this folder is also misused for application data by various software such as files containing settings and saved games. For example:
 Remote Desktop Connection creates a hidden Default.rdp file.
 Windows PowerShell creates a WindowsPowerShell subfolder.
 Microsoft Office creates a Custom Office Templates subfolder.
 Fiddler creates a Fiddler2 subfolder.
 Calibre creates a Calibre library subfolder.
 AutoCAD 2016 creates two subfolders: AutoCAD Sheet Sets and Inventor Server SDK ACAD 2016.

Other "My" folders 
Windows 98 introduced two additional folders with a "My" prefix: "My Music" and "My Pictures". They are not present in Windows Server 2003 by default, unless enabled using the Start menu customization. Running Windows Movie Maker or installing Windows Media Player 10 or 11 on Windows XP adds a "My Videos" folder which Windows Media Player uses to store video files that are shown in its media library. In Windows Vista, "My" prefix is removed and these three folders are expelled out of what is now called "Documents". In addition, other user folders are added: "Contacts", "Downloads", "Favorites", "Links", "Saved Games" and "Searches". Windows 10 adds "OneDrive" and "3D Objects". In Windows 7, under the Public user folder there is a Recorded TV library, that can be added on the libraries list.

Group Policy 
On Windows machines which operate as part of a Windows Server domain, administrators can configure the location of "My Documents" (and other Special Folders) through Group Policy. Corporate desktop deployments commonly redirect "My Documents" to a folder on a file server.

See also 
 My Briefcase
 Home directory
 Windows Shell namespace

References

Further reading 
 Redirect My Documents to the home directory based on security group membership

Windows components
File system directories